St Patricks Tower is a former smock windmill that was built to power the Thomas Street Distillery. It is on Thomas Street, near the corner with Watling Street and is now part of the Digital Hub. The mill was originally built in 1757 and rebuilt in 1815.

References

Smock mills
Buildings and structures in Dublin (city)
Defunct distilleries in Ireland
1757 establishments in Ireland
Towers in Dublin (city)